Leandro Garcia Azevedo Pires (born 16 June 1979) is a Portuguese football coach and a former player. He is currently the manager of Desportivo Aves' U23 team.

Career
Born in Caminha, Leandro, started is youth career at his hometown club, AC Caminha in 1994. A year later, he moved to rivals Âncora-Praia FC. He debuted as a professional in the fourth tier in 1997, he then passed through five other clubs, before arriving at C.D. Aves in 2005, at age 26.

On 21 August 2005, Leandro made his professional debut with DEsportivo de Aves in a 2004–05 Liga de Honra match against Leixões. In the following ten seasons, Leandro has made over 200 league appearances for Desportivo de Aves, ultimately being named team captain. He left Aves after ten seasons and subsequently joined Vianense, assuming the team managerial role on 23 December 2015.

On 21 October 2019 he was appointed caretaker manager of Primeira Liga club Aves following the dismissal of Augusto Inácio.

References

External links

1979 births
Living people
People from Caminha
Portuguese footballers
Association football defenders
Liga Portugal 2 players
C.D. Aves players
SC Vianense players
Portuguese football managers
SC Vianense managers
C.D. Aves managers
Primeira Liga managers
Sportspeople from Viana do Castelo District